Jackson's Warehouse (also known as Jacksons Warehouse) is a nineteenth-century warehouse in the Piccadilly Basin area of Manchester.

History

Built in 1836, it was originally called the Rochdale Canal Warehouse. In 1961, it was still in use as a warehouse. In 1974, it was listed as a Grade II* building. In 2003, a £4.25m restoration project converted the warehouse into residential accommodation and a restaurant.

See also

Grade II* listed buildings in Greater Manchester
Listed buildings in Manchester-M1

References

Commercial buildings in Manchester
Warehouses in England
Grade II* listed buildings in Manchester
Grade II* listed commercial buildings
Grade II* listed industrial buildings